The 1905 VMI Keydets football team represented the Virginia Military Institute (VMI) in their 15th season of organized football. VMI had their worst winning percentage in team history, with a 2–5–1 record under coach Ira Johnson.

Schedule

References

VMI
VMI Keydets football seasons
VMI Keydets football